Lati Hyde-Forster, MBE (14 June 1911 – 12 September 2001) was the first woman to graduate Fourah Bay College. She was also the first African woman school principal in Sierra Leone.

Early life and education 
Latilewa Christiana Hyde was born on 14 June 1911 in Freetown, British Sierra Leone. She is the daughter of Christiana (née Fraser) and Jonathan Hyde  Her father was a Methodist Minister and a graduate of Ranmoor College, Sheffield.  Her mother was the local postmaster and registrar of births and deaths in Murray Town.

Both of her parents were Krios.

She went to secondary school at Annie Walsh Memorial School. In 1938, she was the first woman to graduate from Fourah Bay College.

She got married in 1947 and became Latilewa Hyde-Forster.

Career
In 1947, Hyde-Forster was a senior teacher at Methodist Girls High School in Gambia.

In 1961, she returned to Annie Walsh Memorial School as Vice-Principal and in 1961 became the first black female principal in Sierra Leone.

Honors 
Hyde-Forster received an MBE for her services to education and the community.

References

1911 births
2001 deaths
Sierra Leone Creole people
Annie Walsh Memorial School alumni
Fourah Bay College alumni
Sierra Leonean educators